David Alan Grier (born June 30, 1956) is an American actor and comedian. He began his career by portraying Jackie Robinson in the 1981 Broadway production The First, for which he earned a nomination at the 36th Tony Awards for Best Featured Actor in a Musical. In 1982, he played James "Thunder" Early in the Broadway musical Dreamgirls. He then appeared in the Robert Altman film Streamers (1983) as Roger, a role for which he won the Volpi Cup for Best Actor at the Venice Film Festival.

That same year, he starred in the stage production of A Soldier's Play (1983), and later starred in the film adaptation titled A Soldier's Story (1984). Grier portrayed multiple characters on the American sketch comedy television series In Living Color (1990) (1990–1994). In 1992, he starred alongside Eddie Murphy in the romantic comedy Boomerang. From 1993 to 1997, he played the role of Reverend Leon Lonnie Love on the Fox comedy series Martin. For his performances in the Broadway productions Race (2009) and Porgy and Bess (2012), he received Tony Award nominations, with the latter also earning him a Grammy Award for Best Musical Theater Album nomination. In 2021, he won the Tony Award for Best Featured Actor in a Play for his role as Sergeant Vernon C. Waters in the stage revival of A Soldier's Play (2020).

His other works include starring as Bernard on Damon (1998), as David Bellows on Life with Bonnie (2002–2004), as Joe Carmichael on The Carmichael Show (2015–2017), a principal cast member in The Wiz Live! (2015), as Hal on A Series of Unfortunate Events (2018), Carl Bentley in Jumanji (1995), and Jim Fields in Bewitched (2005). He also created and executive-produced the American satirical show Chocolate News (2008) for Comedy Central.

Early life and education 
Grier was born in Detroit, Michigan, one of three children, to Aretas Ruth (née Blaney), a school teacher, and William Henry Grier, a psychiatrist and writer, who co-wrote the book Black Rage.

He graduated from Detroit's Cass Technical High School, and received a B.A. in radio, television and film from the University of Michigan, and an M.F.A. from the Yale School of Drama, in 1981. Visiting lecturer Rachel Roberts took notice of his performance one evening in a piece entitled The Place of the Spirit Dance.

Career
After graduating from Yale, Grier landed the role of Jackie Robinson in the short-lived Broadway musical The First, directed by Martin Charnin and written by Joel Siegel. Grier was nominated for a Tony Award for Best Featured Actor in a Musical and won the Theatre World Award for The First. He got his start on the National Public Radio radio drama adaptation of Star Wars: The Empire Strikes Back in 1981. He was the voice of a nameless X-wing fighter pilot during the Battle of Yavin.

Grier later starred as James "Thunder" Early in the hit Broadway musical Dreamgirls. Grier made his film debut in 1983 in Streamers, directed by Robert Altman. He won the Golden Lion for Best Actor at the Venice Film Festival for the film. He appeared in the Negro Ensemble Company production A Soldier's Play and reprised his role in the film version A Soldier's Story. Grier appeared as a geology professor at Hillman College in the show A Different World.

In Living Color
Although primarily known for his dramatic work, Grier began to shift towards comedy, making appearances in the cult films Amazon Women on the Moon and I'm Gonna Git You Sucka, whose director Keenen Ivory Wayans cast Grier in his new variety show In Living Color. It became a ratings hit and won an Emmy for Outstanding Variety Series. Grier became a popular cast member through his characters, which ranged from hyperactive children to crotchety old men. Some of his more well-known characters were flamboyant and effeminate Antoine Merriweather in the "Men on..." sketch series, blues musician Calhoun Tubbs (based on Shakey Jake, a busker who often performed near the Michigan campus) megaphone-blaring shop teacher Al MacAfee, the elderly Mr. Brooks, and Tiny, a prison inmate obsessed with female "breastesses".

Acting career 
After his success on In Living Color, Grier began appearing in film comedies such as Boomerang, as Eddie Murphy's shy friend Gerard in 1992; Blankman, with Damon Wayans, in 1994; In the Army Now, as Fred Ostroff with Pauly Shore and Andy Dick, also in 1994; and as Carl Bentley, a factory employee turned police officer whose car is crushed and eaten by a giant pod in Jumanji in 1995. He played Rev. Leon Lonnie Love on the TV series Martin.

Grier appeared with Tom Arnold in the 1997 comedy McHale's Navy as Ensign Charles Parker. In 1999, he made a guest appearance as himself in the "Aw, Here it Goes to Hollywood" episode of Nickelodeon's sitcom Kenan & Kel. After the cancellation of In Living Color, Grier starred in the short-lived sitcoms The Preston Episodes, Damon (with In Living Color co-star Damon Wayans), and DAG. He had a cameo in the Robert De Niro and Edward Burns film 15 Minutes (2001) as a Central Park mugger. In a departure from the comedic roles he played on In Living Color, he portrayed an abusive father in Rusty Cundieff's anthology film Tales from the Hood.

In 2002, Grier joined the cast of the improv-based ABC sitcom and Bonnie Hunt vehicle Life with Bonnie which ran for two seasons. During this time, he continued to appear in comedy films but also returned to drama in the films Baadasssss! (2003) and The Woodsman (2004). He starred in his own Comedy Central stand-up special The Book of David: The Cult Figure's Manifesto. He is also a frequent guest on the Comedy Central show Crank Yankers. Grier was the host of the NBC show Thank God You're Here. He starred in Gym Teacher: The Movie (2008) playing the villain, Shelly Bragg. He appeared as Uncle Henry in the ABC 2005 television film The Muppets' Wizard of Oz.

Grier guest starred in Season 6 of Fox's Bones. He played Professor Bunsen Jude, the Science Dude, the host of a children's TV program. This character was inspired by Bill Nye "the Science Guy".

In May 2013, Grier appeared in Tyler Perry Presents Peeples, playing the role of Virgil Peeples, alongside Kerry Washington and Craig Robinson.  Also in 2013, Grier appeared in The Watsons Go To Birmingham, a Hallmark Channel adaptation of Christopher Paul Curtis' 1995 Newbery Honor-winning novel, The Watsons Go to Birmingham – 1963. He appeared on the CBS TV-adaptation of Bad Teacher, playing the role of principal Carl Gaines. He played the Cowardly Lion in NBC's live performance of The Wiz, which aired on December 3, 2015.

In 1998, Grier co-starred with Jon Stewart in Elmopalooza, as the director of Jon's production crew, who he often chastises at Elmo and Telly after realizing what happened to the rest of the cast. In 2008, Grier starred in the Comedy Central series Chocolate News which had satirical sketches about current events and news stories. It lasted for one season of ten episodes. Grier appeared as Jimmy Dale in the series Queen Sugar appearing in Season 3 and played the role of Mr. Packard in the Paramount Pictures film Clifford the Big Red Dog.

In April 2022, it was announced that Grier would join the cast of the upcoming musical remake, The Color Purple. He is set to play Pastor Avery, the father of Shug Avery, a role also featured in the 1985 film of the same name.

In 2022, he starred in The Patient on Hulu with Steve Carell.

Comedy
Grier is a comedian and hosted the Comedy Central series Premium Blend in 2001. He was ranked no. 94 on Comedy Central's 100 Greatest Stand-Ups. He made an appearance on the Dave, Shelley, and Chainsaw (DSC) Show (San Diego Jack 100.7 FM) on October 5, 2012, before doing performances at The Madhouse Comedy Club. In the interview, he debunked internet reports that he was involved in a musical based on the life of Louis Farrakhan.

Stage
Grier returned to Broadway to perform in the musical A Funny Thing Happened on the Way to the Forum in 1997. He returned to Broadway for the premiere of Race, written and directed by David Mamet, opposite James Spader, Kerry Washington, and Richard Thomas, which opened at the Ethel Barrymore Theatre on December 6, 2009.  Grier received his second Tony Award nomination for his role. He also appeared in the revival production of The Wiz at the La Jolla Playhouse directed by Des McAnuff.

Grier appeared on Broadway as Sportin' Life in the Gershwins' Porgy and Bess, which opened at the Richard Rodgers Theatre on January 12, 2012, alongside Norm Lewis and Audra McDonald. He was nominated for the Tony Award for Best Performance by a Featured Actor in a Musical for this role. In addition to his Tony Award nomination, Grier received a 2013 Grammy nomination for Best Musical Theater Album for his performance on the cast recording of the play.

In January 2020, Grier returned to the stage for the Broadway production of A Soldier's Play, this time playing Tech Sergeant Vernon C. Waters, the role originated by Adolph Caesar in the off-Broadway production. For this role, he won the Tony Award for Best Featured Actor in a Play.

Other work
In 1998 David hosted the game show Random Acts of Comedy on Fox Family, what is now Freeform.  The show lasted one season. He was a contestant on the eighth season of Dancing with the Stars, partnered with Kym Johnson. By the fourth week of the competition, Grier announced that he had lost 26 pounds. He was eliminated in the fifth week.

His first book Barack Like Me: The Chocolate-Covered Truth was published by Simon & Schuster in 2009. The book recounts Grier's own life story, and was written with Alan Eisenstock.

He appeared in an episode of Clean House along with his brother and his brother's family. Grier invited the show to help his brother due to his severe problems with clutter, and the family received a home makeover. He hosted the game show Snap Decision, which debuted August 7, 2017, on the Game Show Network and many Sinclair TV stations.

Personal life
Grier was married to Maritza Rivera and divorced in 1997. In July 2007, he married Christine Y. Kim, an associate curator of the Los Angeles County Museum of Art. She gave birth to their daughter, Luisa Danbi Grier-Kim on January 10, 2008, at Cedars-Sinai Medical Center, in Los Angeles. On July 9, 2009, Kim filed for divorce, citing irreconcilable differences.

When Grier was young, his family marched with Martin Luther King Jr. in a March on Poverty in Detroit, where King gave an early version of the "I Have A Dream" speech.

He is a fan of motorcycles, and owns the rare Yamaha YZF-R1 Limited Edition. On the August 10, 2009, episode of Loveline, Grier agreed to auction it to aid Bryan Bishop's Tumor Fund, but walked off set while Carolla and the audio engineer bickered on air. He is an avid cook and began food blogging during the run of the play Race, where James Spader helped to critique the food Grier made.

Filmography

Film

Television

Radio

Theater

Awards and nominations

References

External links

 
 
 
 

1956 births
African-American male comedians
American male comedians
African-American game show hosts
African-American male actors
American game show hosts
American impressionists (entertainers)
American male film actors
American male musical theatre actors
American male stage actors
American male television actors
American male voice actors
African-American television producers
American television producers
American sketch comedians
American stand-up comedians
Audiobook narrators
Cass Technical High School alumni
Living people
Male actors from Detroit
University of Michigan School of Music, Theatre & Dance alumni
Volpi Cup for Best Actor winners
Yale School of Drama alumni
20th-century American comedians
21st-century American comedians
Film producers from Michigan
20th-century African-American male singers
21st-century African-American people
Tony Award winners